John Evan Roberts (April 20, 1920 – December 16, 2012) was an American football, wrestling and track coach. He served as the head football coach at the University of Wisconsin–Stevens Point from 1956 to 1952, compiling a record of 29–10–1.

As a collegiate athlete, Roberts played college football for the Wisconsin Badgers football team from 1940 to 1942. He was also national runner-up wrestler in 1941 for the Badgers.

Head coaching record

College football

References

1920 births
2012 deaths
Wisconsin–Stevens Point Pointers athletic directors
Wisconsin–Stevens Point Pointers football coaches
Wisconsin Badgers football players
Wisconsin Badgers wrestlers
College wrestling coaches in the United States
High school football coaches in Wisconsin
High school wrestling coaches in the United States
People from Adair County, Iowa
Players of American football from Iowa